Maya Taylor Rosales Alcantara (born July 22, 2000) is an American-born Filipino footballer who plays as a defender or a midfielder for Georgetown University and the Philippines women's national team.

College career

Saint Mary's College of California
Alcantara played her first four years of collegiate soccer at Saint Mary's College of California.

Georgetown University
In 2022, Alcantara pursued her graduate studies at Georgetown University. She was included in the women's soccer team squad.

International career

Philippines
Alcantara was included in the Philippines squad for a month-long training camp in Australia. The training camp was part of the national team's preparation for the 2021 Southeast Asian Games held in Hanoi, Vietnam.

Alcantara made her debut for the Philippines in a 7–0 win against Singapore in the 2022 AFF Women's Championship. She made her second appearance for the Philippines in a 4–0 win against Malaysia. Philippines ended up winning the 2022 AFF Women's Championship title.

Honours

International

Philippines 
 AFF Women's Championship: 2022

References

2000 births
Living people
Citizens of the Philippines through descent
Filipino women's footballers
Women's association football defenders
Women's association football midfielders
Philippines women's international footballers
American women's soccer players
Soccer players from California
Saint Mary's Gaels women's soccer players
Georgetown Hoyas women's soccer players
American people of Filipino descent
American sportspeople of Filipino descent